Vareh Zardi may refer to:
Vareh Zardi, Khorramabad
Vareh Zardi, Pol-e Dokhtar